Roy Servais "Spec" Keene (July 1, 1894 – August 24, 1977) was an American football, baseball, and basketball coach at Willamette University and an athletic director at Oregon State University.

Playing career
Keene graduated from Oregon State University in 1921, where he was a pitcher on the baseball team, and was chosen as team captain in his junior year.

Coaching career
After graduating from Oregon State, Keene signed on with Willamette University's athletic department, where he coached three sports: football for 17 years, baseball for 16 years, and basketball for 11 years. Combined, Keene's teams won or shared 19 Northwest Conference championships, and in the 1929–30 academic year, each of his three teams were undefeated and won conference championships. Keene is considered the "father of Willamette athletics" and was a charter member of the University's Athletic Hall of Fame in 1991.

Attack on Pearl Harbor
On December 6, 1941, Keene's Willamette football team was in Honolulu, Hawaii, where they lost a game to Hawaii, 20–6. The following day, the players and fans had intended to do some sightseeing around Hawaii, but instead, were witness to Japan's attack on Pearl Harbor. The players, now stranded in Hawaii, were enlisted to string barbed wire on Waikiki Beach and were given rifles and assigned to protect the beach and later the hills above Honolulu. Keene, along with future Oregon governor Douglas McKay, who had traveled with the football team, finally arranged passage home for the players on December 19 on an overloaded luxury liner, the SS President Coolidge. The team arrived in San Francisco on Christmas Day after taking a circuitous route to avoid Japanese submarines. In 1997, the entire team was inducted into Willamette's Athletic Hall of Fame.

Return to Oregon State
Following World War II, in 1947, Keene returned to Oregon State to serve as athletic director. He served in that post for 26 years, the longest tenure of any Oregon State athletic director. During his term, he oversaw construction of the University's two major sports facilities: Gill Coliseum in 1949 and Parker Stadium (later renamed Reser Stadium) in 1953. Keene was President of the Pacific Coast Conference Athletics Directors Association and served on the executive committee of the NCAA.

Legacy
In 1989, Willamette University built a new baseball stadium, which they named Roy S. "Spec" Keene Stadium. In addition to the Willamette University Athletic Hall of Fame, Keene was inducted into the Oregon Sports Hall of Fame in 1982 for his coaching, and the Oregon State University Sports Hall of Fame in 1991 for his service as athletic director. He died in Corvallis on August 24, 1977.

Head coaching record

Football

Basketball

References

External links
 

1894 births
1977 deaths
Baseball pitchers
Oregon State Beavers baseball players
Oregon State Beavers athletic directors
Willamette Bearcats baseball coaches
Willamette Bearcats football coaches
Willamette Bearcats men's basketball coaches
Baseball players from Oregon
Basketball coaches from Oregon